Nikolaus Gjelsvik (11 April 1866 –14 November 1938) was a Norwegian jurist and law professor.

He was born at Vevring in Sunnfjord. He served as a professor at the University of Kristiania (now University of Oslo) from 1906.

Among his works are the books Innleiding i rettsstudiet from 1912, Lærebok i folkerett from 1915, and Lærebok i millomfolkeleg privatrett from 1918. He was a proponent for the Nynorsk language,  took part in organisational work, and had leading positions in the publishing house Det Norske Samlaget and in the societies Noregs Ungdomslag and Noregs Mållag.

Marshals at his funeral were Nicolai Rygg and Ferdinand Schjelderup.

References

1866 births
1938 deaths
People from Askvoll
Academic staff of the University of Oslo
Norwegian jurists
Noregs Mållag
Nynorsk-language writers
People from Sunnfjord